Charles Arthur Gauvreau (September 29, 1860 – October 9, 1924) was a Canadian author, notary, and politician.

Born in L'Isle-Verte, Canada East, Gauvreau was educated at the College of Rimouski and Laval University. A notary, he was the author of Captive et Bourreau, Les épreuves d'un orphelin, and Histoire de Trois-Pistoles. He was first elected to House of Commons of Canada for the electoral district of Témiscouata in an 1897 by-election. A Liberal, he was re-elected in 1900, 1904, 1908, 1911, 1917, and 1921. He died in office in 1924.

References
 
 The Canadian Parliament; biographical sketches and photo-engravures of the senators and members of the House of Commons of Canada. Being the tenth Parliament, elected November 3, 1904

External links
 

1860 births
1924 deaths
Liberal Party of Canada MPs
Members of the House of Commons of Canada from Quebec
Université Laval alumni